Pierre Petry (born 13 July 1961) is a retired Luxembourgian football defender.

References

1961 births
Living people
Luxembourgian footballers
FC Progrès Niederkorn players
Jeunesse Esch players
CS Grevenmacher players
Association football defenders
Luxembourg international footballers